Timothy Edward A. Barrett (born 16 March 1948 in Nassau, Bahamas) is a Bahamian former triple jumper who competed in the 1968 Summer Olympics and in the 1972 Summer Olympics.

References

1948 births
Living people
Sportspeople from Nassau, Bahamas
Bahamian male triple jumpers
Olympic athletes of the Bahamas
Athletes (track and field) at the 1968 Summer Olympics
Athletes (track and field) at the 1972 Summer Olympics
Pan American Games competitors for the Bahamas
Athletes (track and field) at the 1967 Pan American Games
Athletes (track and field) at the 1971 Pan American Games
Central American and Caribbean Games gold medalists for the Bahamas
Competitors at the 1966 Central American and Caribbean Games
Athletes (track and field) at the 1966 British Empire and Commonwealth Games
Central American and Caribbean Games medalists in athletics
Commonwealth Games competitors for the Bahamas